Svenska normallyceum i Helsingfors (Norsen) was a Swedish school in the Kaartinkaupunki district of Helsinki between 1864 and 1977. The school was only for boys until 1974 when it became a co-educational school.

History 
Svenska normallyceum was established on the initiative of Johan Vilhelm Snellman in 1864. The school was initially called Helsingfors normalskola, but the name was changed in 1874. As a normal school, Norsen offered prospective teachers auscultation opportunities, which is why it included both classical and realschule education. Between 1867-1872 the school had a department for Finnish-speaking students.

The school was located on Aleksanterinkatu 6 for the first few years and then on Kasarmikatu 48 between 1867-1878. Norsen was then temporarily located in a rented facility at Ratakatu 2, while a new school building designed by architect  Axel Hampus Dahlström was being built. In 1880 the school moved to the new building on Unioninkatu 2, where it remained. 

Norsen was a boys' school until 1974 when it was merged with the girls' school Svenska Flicklyceet i Helsingfors and formed a co-educational school. In 1977 the school was split into the högstadium Högstadieskolan Svenska normallyceum and the gymnasium Ottelinska Gymnasiet, now Gymnasiet Svenska normallyceum.

Famous alumni 

 Alec Aalto, diplomat
 Hans Blomberg, electrical engineer
 Bo Carpelan, author
 Adolf Ehrnrooth, general who served during the Winter and Continuation wars
 Einar Englund, composer
 Jörn Donner, author, director, producer, journalist, politician
 Ragnar Granit, scientist awarded the Nobel Prize in Physiology or Medicine in 1967
 Christian Grönroos, Professor of Service and Relationship Marketing at Hanken
 Harry Helenius, diplomat
 Gustav Hägglund, Commander in Chief of Finnish Armed Forces
 Jan-Magnus Jansson, politician, Professor of general state science
 Erik Kruskopf, art critic, art historian, writer
 Börje Lampenius, actor, director
 Magnus Lindberg, composer, pianist
 Claus Montonen, theoretical physicist
 Leif Segerstam, conductor, composer, violinist, violist, pianist
 Leif Sevón, lawyer, judge
 Mikael Sundman, architect
 Linus Torvalds, creator of the Linux kernel
 Georg Henrik von Wright, philosopher, professor, member of Academy of Finland
 Benedict Zilliacus, journalist

Headmasters 

 Julius Efraim Bergroth 1864-1870
 Alfred Kihlman 1871-1895
 Carl Johan Lindeqvist 1896-1900
 Vilhelm Theodor Rosenqvist 1900-1918

References 

Schools in Helsinki
Educational institutions established in 1864
Educational institutions disestablished in 1977
1864 establishments in Finland